Matjaž Rozman (born 3 January 1987) is a Slovenian footballer who plays for Celje in the Slovenian PrvaLiga.

Club career
Rozman left Aluminij after his first senior season in July 2006 and signed with Interblock, earning 76 league caps.

In January 2010, he signed a two-and-a-half year contract with SpVgg Greuther Fürth. He never broke into the first team and was eventually sent to the reserves. On 30 August 2011, he was released from his contract.

International career
Rozman was a member of the Slovenia under-21 team, making five appearances between 2007 and 2008.

Honours
Celje
Slovenian PrvaLiga: 2019–20

Individual
Slovenian PrvaLiga Team of the Year: 2019–20

References

External links
Matjaž Rozman at NZS 

1987 births
Living people
People from Ptuj
Slovenian footballers
Association football goalkeepers
Slovenian Second League players
Slovenian PrvaLiga players
Regionalliga players
Croatian Football League players
NK Aluminij players
NK IB 1975 Ljubljana players
SpVgg Greuther Fürth players
NK Rudar Velenje players
NK Slaven Belupo players
NK Celje players
Slovenian expatriate footballers
Slovenian expatriate sportspeople in Germany
Expatriate footballers in Germany
Slovenian expatriate sportspeople in Croatia
Expatriate footballers in Croatia
Slovenia youth international footballers
Slovenia under-21 international footballers